EPEC may refer to:
 Eastern Passage Education Centre
 European PPP Expertise Centre
 Enteropathogenic Escherichia coli